The Tweede Schilderijenzaal, or Painting Gallery II, is one of two art gallery rooms in Teylers Museum. The Tweede Schilderijenzaal was built in 1893 as an extension of the first gallery.

History

In 1884 the expansion of the museum, called "Nieuwe Museum" (New Museum), with the addition of the entrance on the Spaarne and the new Fossil rooms, had just been completed to commemorate 100 years of exhibits in the Oval Room. The only part of the museum that had not profited from the expansion was the painting gallery, and this was finally done in 1893 by the regular building crew that the museum kept on hand for renovations. The new gallery was not only meant for extra exhibition space on the walls, but tables were set up for print and drawing viewing in the portfolio holders, a practice which has been kept up until today, although the prints in the viewing portfolios are now copies rather than originals.

Paintings
List of painters in alphabetical order, accompanied by an example hanging in the second gallery:

References

Further reading 
Teyler 1778-1978. Studies en bijdragen over Teylers Stichting naar aanleiding van het tweede eeuwfeest, Haarlem & Antwerp, 1978.
 A. Ouwerkerk,  Romantiek aan het Spaarne. Schilderijen tot 1850 uit de collectie van Teylers Museum Haarlem (Amsterdam 2010) (in Dutch).
 H.J. Scholten, Catalogus met beschrijving van de schilderijender kunstverzameling van Teylers Stichting te Haarlem (Haarlem 1894) (First catalogue of the paintings collection by Teylers curator Hendrik Scholten).

External links 
 Teylers Museum collection database online (in Dutch)

Teylers Museum
Art galleries established in 1838
Rijksmonuments in Haarlem
1838 establishments in the Netherlands
19th-century architecture in the Netherlands
18th-century architecture in the Netherlands